Elias Koteas (born March 11, 1961) is a Canadian actor. He is known for playing Alvin "Al" Olinsky in the Chicago franchise, as well as appearing in lead and supporting roles in  numerous films. He won the Canadian Screen Award for Best Supporting Actor for his role in the film Ararat (2002). He appeared in such films  as Some Kind of Wonderful (1987), The Adjuster (1991), Exotica (1994), The Prophecy (1995), Crash (1996), Living Out Loud (1998), Fallen (1998), The Thin Red Line (1998), Harrison's Flowers (2002), Collateral Damage (2002), Shooter (2007), Zodiac (2007), Skinwalkers (2007), The Curious Case of Benjamin Button (2008), and Shutter Island (2010). He also portrayed Casey Jones in two of the original Teenage Mutant Ninja Turtles films.

Early life
Koteas was born in Montreal, Quebec, Canada, to a father who worked as a mechanic for the Canadian National Railways and a milliner mother. His parents are both of Greek descent. Koteas is a graduate of the American Academy of Dramatic Arts in New York as well as Vanier College in Montreal.

Career
Koteas has played major roles in Some Kind of Wonderful (1987), The Adjuster (1991), Exotica (1994), Crash (1996), Fallen (1998), and The Thin Red Line (1998), among other films. Koteas is also known for playing the lead role of Thomas Daggett in the American film The Prophecy (1995) and for portraying sports-crazed vigilante Casey Jones in two of the original Teenage Mutant Ninja Turtles films. In 2010, he played major roles in Let Me In and Defendor, a Canadian superhero film starring Woody Harrelson.

On television, he appeared in Season Four of The Sopranos as Dominic Palladino and in the Season Two finale of House as a man who shoots Dr. Gregory House. From 2014 to 2018, Koteas starred on the NBC Chicago Fire spin-off Chicago P.D. where he played Alvin "Al" Olinsky, a longtime undercover detective in the Intelligence Unit. He also appeared in all other Chicago franchise series.

Filmography

Film

Television

References

External links

Canadian Film Encyclopedia  

1961 births
Living people
20th-century Canadian male actors
21st-century Canadian male actors
American Academy of Dramatic Arts alumni
Anglophone Quebec people
Best Supporting Actor Genie and Canadian Screen Award winners
Canadian male film actors
Canadian male television actors
Canadian male voice actors
Canadian people of Greek descent
Male actors from Montreal
Vanier College alumni